The Shabin-Karahisar uprising (June 2–30, 1915) was a resistance effort by the Armenian militia of the Hunchaks of the Giresun Province against Ottoman troops during the Armenian genocide. They had resisted the Ottoman onslaught for the duration of a month. The Armenians had positioned themselves in a fort right outside the town where about 250 men fought off Turkish soldiers.

Background
News of the massacres in other regions of Western Armenia made the people of Shabin-Karahisar think that their "turn" was coming soon. In April, 1915, hundreds of young men were suddenly imprisoned. In June, 1915, the region's Armenian religious leader was executed. Then, 200 Armenian merchants were killed as a part of a systematic campaign of genocide by the Ottoman authorities.

The able-bodied Armenians of Shabin-Karahisar thus decided to confront the Ottomans. They started by burning their own homes and fortified themselves in a nearby castle. Many Ottoman soldiers fell those days. After weeks of confrontation, the Armenian militia had no ammunition left. They decided to come out from the castle and fight with their own bare hands. Now, there were only women, children, and elderly in the city, who were all massacred following the resistance's suppression.

Shabin Karahisar (Şebinkarahisar) was the birthplace of Andranik Ozanian, a well-known Armenian fedayee. 

The resistance at Shabin Karahisar was chronicled by Aram Haigaz, who survived the siege and subsequent deportation, in his book The Fall of the Airie.

Footnotes

See also 
Musa Dagh
Şebinkarahisar

1915 in the Ottoman Empire
Armenian resistance during the Armenian genocide
1915 in Armenia
History of Şebinkarahisar
Sivas vilayet
Armenian rebellions in the Ottoman Empire
June 1915 events